Volegi is a rural locality (a village) in Vereshchaginsky District, Perm Krai, Russia. The population was 48 as of 2010.

Geography 
Volegi is located 34 km southwest of Vereshchagino (the district's administrative centre) by road. Nizhniye Garevskiye is the nearest rural locality.

References 

Rural localities in Vereshchaginsky District